The 1948 United States presidential election in Illinois took place on November 2, 1948, as part of the 1948 United States presidential election. State voters chose 28 representatives, or electors, to the Electoral College, who voted for president and vice president.

Illinois was won by incumbent President Harry S. Truman (D–Missouri), running with Senator Alben W. Barkley, with 50.07% of the popular vote, against Governor Thomas Dewey (R–New York), running with Governor Earl Warren, with 49.22% of the popular vote. This is the only time since 1888 in which Illinois voted for a different candidate than New Jersey.

Election information
The primaries and general elections coincided with those for other federal offices (Senate and House), as well as those for state offices.

Turnout
The total vote in the state-run primary elections (Democratic and Republican) was 354,254.

The total vote in the general election was 3,984,046.

Primaries
Both major parties held non-binding state-run preferential primaries on April 13.

Democratic

The 1948 Illinois Democratic presidential primary was held on April 13, 1948, in the U.S. state of Illinois as one of the Democratic Party's state primaries ahead of the 1948 presidential election.

The popular vote was a non-binding "beauty contest". Delegates were instead elected by direct votes by congressional district on delegate candidates.

Incumbent president Harry S. Truman won the state's Democratic primary by a large margin.

While on the ballot in Illinois, neither Dwight D. Eisenhower nor Scott W. Lucas were declared candidates.

Republican

The 1948 Illinois Republican presidential primary was held on April 13, 1948, in the U.S. state of Illinois as one of the Republican Party's state primaries ahead of the 1948 presidential election.

The preference vote was a "beauty contest". Delegates were instead selected by direct-vote in each congressional districts on delegate candidates.

Illinois businessman Riley A. Bender appeared only on Illinois' primary ballot, running as a favorite son. He won the primary.

General election

Results by county

See also
 United States presidential elections in Illinois

References

Illinois
1948
1948 Illinois elections